Margaret Uyauperq Aniksak (1907–1993) was an Inuit sculptor who lived in Arviat, Nunavut.

Her work is included in the collections of the National Gallery of Canada and the Winnipeg Art Gallery.

References

 1907 births
 1993 deaths
20th-century Canadian artists
20th-century Canadian women artists
Inuit artists
20th-century Canadian sculptors
Canadian women sculptors